Linos-Alexandre Sicilianos (born 9 May 1960) is a Greek jurist born in Athens, Greece. He was a judge of the European Court of Human Rights in respect of Greece between 2011 and 2020. 

He studied law at the University of Athens from where he graduated in 1983. He followed up on his studies at the Robert Schuman University in Strasbourg, from where he obtained a MSc in International Law in 1984 and Doctorate in 1990. On 1 May 2017 he was appointed Vice-President of the Court, and Section President of Section I. He was elected President of the European Court of Human Rights on 1 April 2019, succeeding Guido Raimondi. On 18 May 2020, Róbert Ragnar Spanó from Iceland succeeded him.

He was a candidate for the 2021 International Court of Justice judges election, but Hilary Charlesworth was elected instead.

References

External link

Living people
Judges of the European Court of Human Rights
1960 births
20th-century Greek lawyers
Lawyers from Athens
Greek judges of international courts and tribunals
National and Kapodistrian University of Athens alumni
21st-century Greek judges
International law scholars